Mirabilandia is the only fixed amusement park in Northeastern Brazil. It is located between Recife and Olinda, and it occupies 57,000 m2 of land. Mirabilandia operates three traveling parks in Brazil, called Universal Park, Fiesta Park and American Park.

History
Mirabilandia is an amusement park located in the Brazilian state of Pernambuco. Opened in 2002, it's now one of the most successful amusement parks in Brazil. Resulting from a partnership between the group Peixoto and an Italian group, it had 15 rides and 1 coaster at opening, but today features more than 30 attractions, and is the Brazilian park which made the largest investment by buying new attractions. The Mirabilandia of Pernambuco is the only fixed amusement park in the entire Northeast of Brazil. The park features 35 attractions in categories frightening, radical, and family. 
It also has a medical clinic, coat check, sanitary sector, lost and found, a lounge with games and a stage for shows, plays, and musicals. The park also has special programs, such as the educational project "Lessons in the Park" which takes children and young people from public schools and private lessons for multidisciplinary education using the park as scenery and attractions as learning tools.

In addition, the park has several themes such as "Fazendinha Mirabilandia", "The Gardens", and "Rio das Pedras" which has the objective of raising ecological and nature awareness. As of 2012, the park is being expanded due to high demand.

Hora do Terror - Hour of Terror
Every year from October to December are the presentations of "Time of Terror" a terrifying event with an opening that starts at 6:00 PM and at the end of the show featured actors of monsters walk in the park frightening everyone to come forward. Each year the event has a different theme:
 2002  Psychosis
 2003  Nightmare
 2004  Macabre portal
 2005  End of time
 2006  Mystery of Illusion
 2007  The Enigma
 2008  The Unknown - Aliens
 2009  The Secret Treasure - Pirates vs. Cannibals
 2010  Bloody Attack: Vampires vs. Werewolves

Attractions
The park has 30 attractions, not counting games and contests, which are paid separately. As the Mirabilandia uses a rotation system of attractions with the other three traveling parks, Universal Park, Fiesta Park, and American Park rides vary from season to season (except the coasters). One of the great attractions of the park is the roller coaster Super Tornado Dutch company Vekoma which was bought at scrap value of the Luna Park when the rollercoaster was covered with rust, but the park has reformed and is now in full operation. New for the 2010 season is the Move it (only in the country),toy super radical. The park bought a new roller coaster, parts of it have entered the park and is scheduled to launch in early 2011 with the name Sky Mountain.

Thrill
 Super Tornado: Roller coaster rails yellows and oranges brackets manufactured by Vekoma.
 Megadance: Also known as La Bamba, Samba, Tagada, or Tagadisck Pandeiro.
 Move It: Only of the style in Brazil.
 Trampoline: Paid attraction.
 Over Loop: Similar to "Top Spin", but it's a smaller and faster version.
Thunder: A mechanical arm that balances in 180 ° reaching 25 meters of height, inaugurated in 2012
 Climbing Wall: paid attraction to the part that refers to the new roller coaster Sky Mountain.
 Sky Mountain: Roller coaster with green rails and blues brackets manufactured by Vekoma. It's a Giant Inverted Boomerang for 2021.
Makaya Mount: Roller Coaster with White rails and white brackets manufactured by Intamin. For 2021.
Wave Swinger: the classic Mexican hat from Six Flags made by Zamperla (Flying Swinger).

Family
 Splash: Ride that leads people to two waterfalls.
 Waimea: boats that carry passengers where they get on a 15-meter-high lift, and after navigating a canal, they continue to encounter a waterfall (for 2021).
 Auto Lane: (known as Bumper cars)
 Saltamontes: Completely renovated, visitors ascend and descend to the rhythm of a song.
 Giant Wheel: (Ferris Wheel)
 Rock & Roll (Matterhorn): single ride in the country, makes movements in the waveform in which they turn 20 sleds.
 Cyclone
 Sea Dragon 
 Dragon (mini roller coaster)
 Elastic Bed
 Venetian Carousel

Horror
 Ghost Train (Dark ride)
 House of Terror

References
Water parks in Brazil
Amusement parks in Brazil
1994 establishments in Brazil
Amusement parks opened in 1994